The Berkeley Pit is a former open pit copper mine in the western United States, located in Butte, Montana. As a result, the pit is laden with heavy metals and dangerous chemicals that leach from the rock, including copper, arsenic, cadmium, zinc, and sulfuric acid.

The mine was opened in 1955 and operated by the Anaconda Copper Mining Company, and later by the Atlantic Richfield Company (ARCO), until its closure on Earth Day in 1982. Since its closure, the water level in the pit has risen to within  of the natural water table.

The Berkeley Pit is currently one of the largest Superfund sites. The water, with dissolved oxygen, allows pyrite and sulfide minerals in the ore and wall rocks to decay, releasing acid. The acidic water in the pit carries a heavy load of dissolved heavy metals. A water treatment plant has been operating since October 2019.

The Berkeley Pit is a tourist attraction, with an adjacent gift shop. An admission fee is charged to go out on the viewing platform.

History

The underground Berkeley Mine was located on a prominent vein extending to the southeast from the main Anaconda vein system. When open pit mining operations began in July 1955, near the Berkeley Mine shaft, the older mine gave its name to the pit. The open-pit style of mining superseded underground operations because it was far more economical and much less dangerous than underground mining.

Within the first year of operation, the pit extracted 17,000 tons of ore per day at a grade of 0.75% copper. Ultimately, about 1,000,000,000 tons of material were mined from the Berkeley Pit. Copper was the principal metal produced, although other metals were also extracted, including silver and gold.

Two communities and much of Butte's previously crowded east side were consumed by land purchases to expand the pit during the 1970s. The Anaconda Company bought the homes, businesses and schools of the working-class communities of Meaderville, East Butte, and McQueen, east of the pit site. Many of these homes were either destroyed, buried, or moved to the southern end of Butte. Residents were compensated at market value for their acquired property.

Pollution, toxicity, and cleanup 

The Berkeley Pit is a part of the Silver Bow Creek/Butte Area Environmental Protection Agency Superfund site, considered one of the largest in America, and the pit itself was added to the federal Superfund site list in 1987. It is one of sixteen Superfund sites in Montana, and the Berkeley Pit is the final unrestored section of the Silver Bow Creek/Butte Area site.

In 1995, a flock of migrating geese landed in the Berkeley Pit and died. A total of 342 carcasses were recovered. ARCO, the custodian of the pit, denied that the toxic water caused the death of the geese, attributing the deaths to an acute aspergillosis infection that may have been caused by a grain fungus, as substantiated by Colorado State University necropsy findings. These findings were disputed by the State of Montana on the basis of its own lab tests. Necropsies showed their insides were lined with burns and festering sores from exposure to high concentrations of copper, cadmium, and arsenic. (Levels of copper are high enough that Montana Resources has mined copper directly from the water.)

On November 28, 2016, several thousand snow geese died after a large flock landed in the pit's water to avoid a snowstorm. Immediately after the event, officials made efforts to scare birds away and prevent more from landing in the area. An official report issued in 2017 by the U.S. Fish and Wildlife Service found that the 3,000 to 4,000 snow geese that died at the Berkeley Pit were killed by exposure to sulfuric acid and heavy metals.

The Berkeley Pit started utilizing Phoenix Wailers, which have been effective in deterring birds from landing at or staying in Berkeley Pit for an extended period of time. (A Wailer is a machine that causes birds to move away from airport runways and helipads, using high fidelity natural sounds such as distress calls, alarm calls and cries of predators.) Studies have shown that the Wailers have been effective in limiting bird deaths in most cases, but they have not worked as well when faced with a large number of birds. Staff also use firearms to scare away birds during spring migration seasons.

Construction began on a treatment plant at the Berkeley Pit in 2018, to treat water in the Pit before it would contaminate local groundwater. The treatment facility will be able to treat ten million gallons of water per day. Construction of the $19 million facility was completed in August 2019 and the first discharge of treated water into a local creek happened in October 2019.

Important dates

1994 – September, EPA/DEQ issue Record of Decision (ROD) for Butte Mine Flooding Operable Unit. 
1996 – April, Montana Resources (MR) and ARCO divert Horseshoe Bend (HSB) drainage water away from Berkeley Pit to slow filling rate, per ROD. 
2000 – July, MR suspends mining operations due to high energy costs; HSB water allowed to flow back into pit, increasing pit filling rate. 
2002 – March, USEPA and Montana Department of Environmental Quality (MDEQ) enter into a Consent Decree with BP/ARCO and the Montana Resources Group (known as the Settling Defendants) for settlement of past and future costs for this site. 
2002 (mid/late) – USEPA and MDEQ issue order for Settling Defendants to begin design of water treatment plant for HSB water. Settling Defendants issue contract and begin construction of treatment plant. 
2003 – November, MR resumes mining operations. 
2003 – November 17, HSB water treatment plant comes on line slowing pit filling rate.

Geography

Geology
The Butte mining district is characterized by the Late Cretaceous Boulder batholith which metamorphosed surrounding rocks during the Laramide orogeny. Ore formation occurred with the intrusion of the Butte quartz monzonite pluton. Mining of sulfide minerals began in the district in 1864. Placer deposits were mined out by 1867. Silver vein lodes were then the most productive until copper was discovered in 1881. Open-pit mining started in 1955. Copper has historically been the main metal produced, though lead, zinc, manganese, silver and gold have been produced at various times.

Organisms in the water

A protozoan species, Euglena mutabilis, was found to reside in the pit by Andrea A. Stierle and Donald B. Stierle, and the protozoans have been found to have adapted to the harsh conditions of the water. Intense competition for the limited resources caused these species to evolve the production of highly toxic compounds to improve survivability; natural products such as berkeleydione, berkeleytrione, and berkelic acid have been isolated from these organisms which show selective activity against cancer cell lines. Some of these species ingest metals and are being investigated as an alternative means of cleaning the water.

Photos

See also
Auditor (dog)
Chemocline
Dark Money
List of Superfund sites in Montana
Water pollution in the United States
Bingham Canyon Mine (in Utah)

References

Further reading

External links

Berkeley Pit Photos from the Montana Department of Environmental Quality
PitWatch
ISS image of Berkeley Pit (dated August 2, 2006)
Butte, Montana toxic waste site turned tourist attraction yielding compounds that may be medically, environmentally useful
"Casualties of Copper: The Berkeley Pit, Montana." Sometimes Interesting. 20 November 2013

1955 establishments in Montana
1983 establishments in Montana
Anaconda Copper
Butte, Montana
Copper mines in the United States
Environmental disasters in the United States
Historic American Engineering Record in Montana
History of Montana
Geography of Silver Bow County, Montana
Geology of Montana
Mines in Montana
Open-pit mines
Superfund sites in Montana
Surface mines in the United States
Tourist attractions in Butte, Montana